Warren Jones (born 23 September 1966) is a former quarterback in the CFL, where he played from 1989 to 1996 for two teams. Jones played college football at the University of Hawaii.

External links
Just Sports Stats
Career stats

1966 births
Living people
Players of Canadian football from Dallas
American players of Canadian football
Canadian football quarterbacks
Edmonton Elks players
Saskatchewan Roughriders players
Hawaii Rainbow Warriors football players
American football quarterbacks